Cormac McGuinness is an Irish Gaelic footballer. McGuinness plays with his local club Navan O'Mahonys and has been a senior member of the Meath county team since 2007.

McGuinness made his championship debut in June 2007 during the Leinster Quarter-final replay against Dublin as a sub.

References

Year of birth missing (living people)
Living people
Meath inter-county Gaelic footballers
Navan O'Mahoneys Gaelic footballers